Baron Thweng (Tweng, Thwinge etc.) is an abeyant title in the Peerage of England created on 22 February 1307 for Sir Marmaduke Thweng, a famous knight who took part in the First War of Scottish Independence. The title became abeyant upon the death of his third son Thomas Thweng, 4th Baron Thweng in 1374.

Lords Thweng
Marmaduke Thweng, 1st Baron Thweng
William Thweng, 2nd Baron Thweng
Robert Thweng, 3rd Baron Thweng
Thomas Thweng, 4th Baron Thweng (died 28 May 1374)

References

1307 establishments in England
Abeyant baronies in the Peerage of England
Noble titles created in 1307